Harold Hanson may refer to:

 Harold Hanson (lawyer) (1904–1973), South African advocate
 Harold Hanson (soccer) (born 1999), American soccer player
 Harold E. Hanson (died 1978), mayor of Madison, Wisconsin
 Hal Hanson (Harold William Hanson, 1895–1973), American football player and coach
 Hal Hanson (American football guard) (Harold Walter Hanson, 1905–1977), American football player